Cape Flats Sand Fynbos (CFSF), previously known as Sand Plain Fynbos, is a critically endangered vegetation type that occurs only within the city of Cape Town. Less than 1% of this unique lowland fynbos vegetation is conserved.

Description
This is the richest and most diverse type of Sand Fynbos. It also has the highest number of threatened plant species. It is the wettest and coolest of all West Coast Sand Fynbos, growing primarily in deep, white, acidic sands. It is dominated by Proteoid and Restioid fynbos, but Ericaceous fynbos also occurs in wetter areas and Asteraceous fynbos in drier spots. In winter, seasonal wetlands appear in many areas, and mists often cover the landscape.

Threats and conservation
Lying as it does entirely within the limits of Cape Town, over 85 percent of what was once Cape Town's commonest vegetation type is now destroyed and covered by urban sprawl. Half of what remains is badly infested with invasive alien plants (Acacia saligna, Acacia cyclops, Pinus, Eucalyptus and Kikuyu grass), and less than 1 percent is actually statutorily conserved.

Surviving pockets exist in several small nature reserves within the city, such as Rondevlei, Kenilworth Racecourse, Rondebosch Common and Tokai Park. These are identified as “Core Conservation Sites”. However, these sites alone are too small to preserve this vegetation type, and they themselves are threatened by invasive alien plants and the destructive practise of mowing (which eliminates all the tall and serotinous species).

Habitat preserves
Nature preserves with Cape Flats Sand Fynbos habitat include:
Blaauwberg Conservation Area
Edith Stephens Wetland Park
Greater Princess Vlei Conservation Area
Kenilworth Racecourse Conservation Area
Macassar Dunes Conservation Area
Milnerton Racecourse Nature Reserve
Rondebosch Common
Rondevlei Nature Reserve
Tokai Park (Table Mountain National Park)
Witzands Aquifer Conservation Area
Wolfgat Nature Reserve
Zandvlei Estuary Nature Reserve
Westridge Gardens

Historically, areas of Cape Town that were not developed for housing were often planted with commercial plantations of invasive European Pines. A fire at Tokai Park in 1998 revealed that this pine plantation is located on top of intact CFSF seed beds from its original vegetation. To date over 340 indigenous plants have emerged from the seed bank, and 22 threatened plant species and 2 threatened amphibian species are present.

Cape Flats Sand Fynbos is particularly rich in Protea and Erica species, many of which are endemic to this vegetation type and occur nowhere else. This was also the habitat of several species of plant which are now extinct, such as the Aspalathus variegata (the Cape Flats Capegorse), Erica pyramidalis (the Pyramid Heath), Erica turgida (the Showy Heath), Erica verticillata (the Whorl Heath) and Liparia graminifolia (Grass Mountainpea).

Endemic flora

Some plant species that are endemic to this vegetation type include:
 Aspalathus variegata (The Cape Flats Gorse. Probably extinct)
 Athanasia capitata
 Cliffortia ericifolia
 Erica margaritacea
 Erica pyramidalis (extinct)
 Erica turgida (extinct in the wild)
 Erica verticillata (extinct in the wild)
 Ixia versicolor
 Lampranthus stenus
 Leucadendron levisanus
 Liparia graminifolia (probably extinct)
 Serruria aemula (The Strawberry Spiderhead. Critically endangered)
 Serruria foeniculacea
 Serruria furcellata
 Tetraria variabilis
 Trianoptiles solitaria

See also
 
  
  
 
 
  
 Index: Fynbos - habitats and species.

References

External links
 Cape Flats Sand Fynbos -Notes of a Cape Town Botanist
 BotSoc: Saving the Cape Flats Sand Fynbos
 Cape Flats Sand Fynbos: Fact Sheet

Fynbos ecosystems
.
Vegetation types of Cape Town